The Syrian women's national volleyball team represents Syria at the international volleyball competitions and friendly matches. As of 4 September 2022, the team was ranked 120th in the world.

Honours

West Asia Championship
 2022: 6th

Mediterranean Games

 1987: 5th

Pan Arab Games

 1992: 
 1999: 4th

Team

Current squad
The following is the Syrian roster in the 2022 West Asia Championship.

 Head coach: Hassan Sakhal
 Darren Ibrahim
 Noor Dwaier
 Sarma Jabbour
 Khulouf Verses
 Ana Asf
 Sarah Rahmon
 Hind Daaboul
 Lama Al-Batal
 Sally Hamada
 Santa Al-Salama
 Zina Sawaf
 Maggie Sheikh
 Ruhaif Al-Hassan

See also
Syria men's national volleyball team

References

Volleyball
National women's volleyball teams
Women